"Unknown Song" is an instrumental track written and recorded by the British progressive rock group Pink Floyd. It has been released only on a bonus disc included in the 1997 re-release of the soundtrack to Michelangelo Antonioni's movie Zabriskie Point.

Music
The track is simple and consists of melodies that were used later; the riff that starts to play at 1:54 is a faster tempo version of the "Funky Dung" section of "Atom Heart Mother Suite". The main melody played by acoustic 12-string guitar throughout the song is somewhat typical to the band's later style – "A Pillow of Winds" or even "Brain Damage" can be heard as followers of the song's melodies.

Other names
"Unknown Song" is sometimes called "Rain in the Country" or "Country Rain" on bootleg recordings. A similar piece entitled "Baby Blue Shuffle in D Major" appeared in a 2 December 1968 BBC radio broadcast and shared melodies with part one of "The Narrow Way" from Ummagumma, but it may have been rather a different – or even the same – take of "Unknown Song". Rain in the country Take 2 ends in Crumbling Land which has similar music. The music of  Country Song/The Red Queen Theme Take 1 is also similar.

See Also
 Crumbling Land
 Country Song/The Red Queen Theme

References 

1969 songs
Pink Floyd songs
Rock instrumentals
Songs written by David Gilmour
Songs written by Nick Mason
Songs written by Roger Waters
Songs written by Richard Wright (musician)